is a passenger railway station located in the city of Gyōda, Saitama, Japan, operated by the private railway operator Chichibu Railway.

Lines

Station layout
This station consists of a single side platform, serving a single bi-directional track.

Adjacent stations

History
Higashi-Gyōda Station opened on 20 November 1932.

Passenger statistics
In fiscal 2018, the station was used by an average of 2388 passengers daily.

Surrounding area
 
 Saitama Prefectural Shinshukan Senior High School

References

External links

 Higashi-Gyōda Station timetable 
 Higashi-Gyōda Station information (Saitama Prefecture) 

Railway stations in Japan opened in 1932
Railway stations in Saitama Prefecture
Gyōda